The Band of Holes, also known in Spanish as Monte Sierpe (serpent mountain) or Cerro Viruela (smallpox hill), is a series of about 5,000–6,000 man-sized holes found in the Pisco Valley on the Nazca Plateau in Peru. Local people have no idea who made them or how they were used. Over the years, it has been speculated that they were graves, defensive positions, or storage places. Recent thought is that they were storage pits built during the time of the Inca Empire (1438–1533).

Description 
The band begins at the edge of a valley and runs up a hill for about 1.5 km. The holes, actually pits with raised edges, are about 1 meter in diameter and 50–100 cm deep. They are arranged in discernable blocks or segments along a band that varies in width from 14–21 meters, with an average width of about 19 meters.

Recent investigations

Modern attention was drawn to the site in 1933, when the aviator Robert Shippee published an aerial photograph in National Geographic.

Victor Wolfgang von Hagen surveyed the area in 1953. In The Royal Road of the Inca he describes these as pre-Inca graves, writing that:

These circular, stone-lined although unused graves lay in rows, seven to nine, and marched up the 50° angle to the slope called Mt. Sierpe, that is the “shaking” line of graves reminding the one who named it of a serpent. There are over 5,000 such graves; empty, graves in so far as they are circular and stone-lined, and of the same construction of those graves which are found with mummies, weavings and pottery. For years, ever since 1931 they appeared on the photographic plates of the aerial surveys of the Shippee–Johnson expedition, they were the "strange and mysterious pockmarks”, but when discovered and surveyed by the von Hagen expedition in 1953 and found to be unused graves, the mystery was compounded. The Inca engineers would have seen the same phenomena but as in the case of the equally mysterious Nasca lines, they filled in those which interfered with the road and ran it over and through them.

Other visits were made in the early 1970s by archaeologists Dwight Wallace and Frederic Engel.

Archaeologist John Hyslop wrote in his 1984 book The Inka Road System that "Circular structures, sometimes semisubterranean, that may have been used for storage are also found on the Peruvian south coast in the sites Quebrada de la Vaca (Andes 1960:252, 253) and at Tambo Colorado. Hundreds of stone-lined circular holes in rows have been found on a low ridge on the north side of the Pisco Valley (Shippee 1933:93; Wallace 1971:105–106). Although their role has not been determined, a hypothesis for investigation is that they were used for storage. They are between two important Inka sites (Tambo Colorado and Lima la Vieja), and very near the point where the Inka coastal road crosses the road to the highlands. They might be one of the empire's larger storage sites."

In 2015, archaeologists from UCLA made a brief visit to the site, using photography from drone aircraft to create a detailed map. They speculate that the holes could have been used to measure produce given to the Inca state as tribute; the measurements might have been recorded on Incan khipus and reported to government officials. The archaeologists hope to do further studies to detect pollen or phytoliths that could tend to confirm this hypothesis.

References

Further reading 

Engel, Frederic. 2010. Arqueología Inédita de la Costa Peruana. Lima: Asamblea Nacional de Rectores. 
Shippee, Robert. 1933. Air Adventures in Peru. National Geographic 63(1):81–120. 
Silva Santisteban, Fernando. 2005. Las líneas de Nazca: otra interpretación. Lima: La Insignia. Electronic document.
Urton, Gary, and Alejandro Chu. In press. The Inkawasi Khipus: An Inka State Storage Facility and Accounting Center on the South Coast of Peru. Latin American Antiquity.
Wallace, Dwight T. 1971. Sitios arqueológicos del Perú (segunda entrega): valles de Chincha y de Pisco. Arqueológicas 13:4–131.

External links 
Piotr Strzyzewski; Personal report of a 1998 trip
 Satellite Map
Official webpage on the Peruvian Ministry of Foreign Commerce and Tourism website (in Spanish)

Geology of Peru
Archaeological sites in Peru